"Everything About You" may refer to:

 "Everything About You" (Ugly Kid Joe song)
 "Everything About You" (Sanctus Real song)
 "Everything About You", a song by One Direction from the album Up All Night